William Somerset may refer to:

William Somerset Maugham (1874–1965), English playwright, novelist and short story writer
William Somerset, 3rd Earl of Worcester (1526–1589), English nobleman and courtier
Lord William Somerset (1784–1851)
Detective William Somerset, the main character in the 1995 film Seven, played by Morgan Freeman